Chiange is a town and commune in the municipality of Gambos, province of Huíla, Angola.

It is also the seat of the municipality of Gambos.

It is terminus of a branch of the Moçâmedes Railway, which is the southernmost of the three railway networks in Angola, junctioning at Dongo.

References

Populated places in Huíla Province
Communes in Huíla Province